This is a list of radio stations in the Mexican state of Chiapas, which can be sorted by their call signs, frequencies, location, ownership, names, and programming formats.

Defunct stations
 XHTAK-FM 103.5, Tapachula
 XHUE-FM 99.3, Tuxtla Gutiérrez

Notes

References 

Chiapas